Liana Daine Liberato (born August 20, 1995) is an American actress. She played the younger version of the female lead in the 2014 film The Best of Me and starred in the drama films The Last Sin Eater (2007) and Trust (2010), the thriller films Trespass (2011) and Erased (2012), and the horrors Haunt (2013) and The Beach House (2019). In 2017, she was part of the ensemble cast of the drama Novitiate and in 2018 she starred in the comedy Banana Split.

From 2018 to 2019, Liberato starred in the leading role on the Hulu thriller series Light as a Feather as McKenna Brady, for which she received two nominations for a Daytime Emmy Award for Outstanding Lead Actress in a Digital Daytime Drama Series (2019) and Outstanding Principal Performance in a Daytime Program (2020). She would then appear in Scream VI (2023).

Early life
Liberato was born on August 20, 1995. She is from Galveston, Texas.

Career
In 2005, Liberato made her acting debut in the television series Cold Case and has appeared on Sons of Anarchy, CSI: Miami. She also made an appearance in the music video for Miley Cyrus's song, "7 Things". The following year she appeared in the fourth season of House, and was featured in the June issue of The New York Times Magazine. In 2007, Liberato obtained the leading role in the 20th Century Fox adventure film The Last Sin Eater.

2010 found Liberato starring in the film Trust. Her performance, praised by Roger Ebert in his review of the film, won her the Silver Hugo Award for Best Actress at the 46th Chicago International Film Festival. In June, she was cast in the film Trespass. She played Kim in If I Stay and the younger version of the female lead in the 2014 film The Best of Me. In 2014, Liberato was named one of the best actors under the age of 20 by IndieWire.

Filmography

Film

Television

Web

Music videos

Awards and nominations

References

External links

 
 

1995 births
21st-century American actresses
Actresses from Texas
American child actresses
American film actresses
American television actresses
Living people
People from Galveston, Texas
Place of birth missing (living people)